Dom Duarte Nuno, Duke of Braganza (23 September 1907 – 24 December 1976) was the claimant to the defunct Portuguese throne, as both the Miguelist successor of his father, Miguel Januário, Duke of Braganza, and later as the head of the only Brigantine house, after the death of the last ruling Braganza, King Manuel II of Portugal. In 1952, when the Portuguese Laws of Banishment were repealed (27 May 1950), the Duke moved his family to Portugal, thus returning the Miguelist Braganzas to their homeland and becoming the first of the former Portuguese royal dynasty to live in Portugal since the abolition of the monarchy, in 1910.

Once established in Portugal, the Duke was granted a pension and residence by the Fundação da Casa de Bragança, the organization has owned and managed all the private assets of the House of Braganza, since the death of King Manuel II, in 1932. Duarte Nuno spent the rest of his life attempting, without success, the restoration of all Brigantine assets to his family and recreating the image of the Miguelist Braganzas in Portuguese society, all under the goal of the restoration of the Portuguese monarchy, under the Braganzas.

In 1942, the Duarte Nuno married Maria Francisca de Orléans e Bragança, daughter of Pedro de Alcântara, Prince of Grão-Pará. The couple had three sons, the eldest of whom is Duarte Pio de Bragança, the current pretender to the defunct Portuguese throne.

Birth

Duarte Nuno Fernando Maria Miguel Gabriel Rafael Francisco Xavier Raimundo António was born at Seebenstein Castle in Austria-Hungary, the son of Miguel Januário, Duke of Braganza and of his second wife, Princess Maria Theresa of Löwenstein-Wertheim-Rosenberg.  Duarte Nuno had two older half-brothers, one older half-sister and eight sisters.

His paternal grandparents were Miguel I of Portugal and Princess Adelaide of Löwenstein-Wertheim-Rosenberg. His maternal grandparents were Charles, Prince of Löwenstein-Wertheim-Rosenberg, and Princess Sophie of Liechtenstein.

Duarte Nuno's father was the Miguelist claimant to the throne of Portugal who opposed his cousins, the reigning line of the House of Braganza-Saxe-Coburg and Gotha descended from Queen Maria II.  Duarte Nuno's family had been disinherited and banished by Maria II for rebellion.  In spite of this, with the permission of Emperor Franz Joseph I of Austria, Portuguese soil had been placed under the bed where he was born, so that Duarte Nuno and his siblings could claim to have been born on Portuguese soil in order to comply with the Portuguese law of succession.

The day after his birth, Duarte Nuno was baptised at Seebenstein.  His godparents were his aunt the Infanta Aldegundes, Duchess of Guimarães and the husband of another aunt, the Infante Alfonso Carlos, Duke of San Jaime (both of whom were represented by proxies).

Succession as Miguelist claimant
Duarte Nuno's second brother, Prince Francis Joseph of Braganza, died in 1919, and on 21 July 1920 his eldest brother, Prince Miguel, Duke of Viseu, renounced his succession rights. Ten days later on 31 July 1920 Duarte Nuno's father, Miguel Januário, abdicated his claim to the Portuguese throne in favour of Duarte Nuno.  Henceforth the Miguelists recognised Duarte Nuno as King Duarte II of Portugal, even though Portugal had become a republic in 1910 when Maria II's great-grandson, King Manuel II (who was still living in 1920), was sent into exile. Duarte Nuno used Duke of Braganza as a title of pretense.

Since Duarte Nuno was only twelve years old when he succeeded as Miguelist claimant to the Portuguese throne, his aunt, the Duchess of Guimarães, acted as regent for him until he attained his majority.  In 1921, she issued a manifesto outlining the family's goals for the restoration of the monarchy.

The renouncement of Duarte Nuno's father was intended to improve the relationship between the two monarchist groups in Portugal: the supporters of the Braganza-Saxe-Coburg line of Manuel II and the supporters of the Miguelist line of Duarte Nuno. The Braganza-Saxe-Coburg line was called "constitutional" because it had accepted a liberal constitution for Portugal.

Succession as Constitutional claimant

After the death of his uncle Afonso in 1920, ex-King Manuel II had no close relatives who could claim the throne according to the Constitutional Charter of 1826 (the constitution in force from 1842 until the overthrow of the monarchy in 1910).  The conflict between the Miguelist line and the Braganza-Saxe-Coburg and Gotha's was not just about which person should be sovereign; it was also about how much power the sovereign should have. The Miguelists upheld Portugal's tradition of autocratic absolutism, while the Braganza-Saxe-Coburg and Gotha's adhered to constitutional monarchy.

In 1912, Duarte Nuno's father, Miguel Januário, met with Manuel to try to come to some agreement so that there would not be two claimants to the Portuguese throne, both living in exile.  Their representatives allegedly signed the Pact of Dover by which Miguel Januário recognised Manuel as king, while Manuel recognised the succession rights of Duarte Nuno should Manuel and his uncle Afonso die without children. The pact was unpopular with the supporters of both sides, some claiming that it was never actually signed.

On 17 April 1922 a second agreement called the Pact of Paris was signed by the representatives of Duarte Nuno and Manuel in which Manuel agreed that the Cortes should select his heir if he died without descendants, while Duarte Nuno agreed to ask and recommend that his followers accept Manuel as king-in-exile.

Strictly speaking the Pact of Dover and the Pact of Paris were private agreements, legally unenforceable.  Nor did King Manuel agree to any provision in the latter pact which contravened Portugal's last monarchist constitution.  But the agreements were important steps in reconciling the Miguelist and the Braganza-Saxe-Coburg branches of Portugal's royal family, and helped move the supporters of each toward a united monarchist movement.

In 1927, Duarte Nuno's father died.  On 2 July 1932 Manuel II died. Henceforth, the majority of monarchists, both Miguelist and constitutional, supported Duarte Nuno as claimant to the Portuguese throne. João António de Azevedo Coutinho, the head of Causa Monárquica and Manuel II's lieutenant while he was in exile, published a declaration in support of Duarte Nuno.  Later Duarte Nuno was received in audience in Paris by Manuel's mother, Queen Amélia.

While Duarte Nuno was accepted by most monarchists, there were some constitutionalists who continued to contest his claim.  Duarte Nuno was undisputed as the legal heir of his grandfather, Miguel I, but there were doubts about whether he was the legal heir of the last reigning king of Portugal, Manuel II.  Articles 87 and 88 of the Constitutional Charter of 1826, in force when the monarchy was overthrown, stated that the throne passed first to the descendants of Queen Maria II (from whom Duarte Nuno was not descended), and only when they were extinct to collateral heirs.  Maria II had living descendants in 1932, but none of these had Portuguese nationality. Article 89 of the 1826 Charter stipulated that "no foreigner may succeed to the crown of the kingdom of Portugal".

There was also some doubt about Duarte Nuno's nationality. Duarte Nuno's grandfather had been sent into exile by the law of 19 December 1834. Neither Duarte Nuno nor his father were born in Portugal, but Austrian Emperor Franz Joseph had granted extraterritoriality to Duarte Nuno's birthplace. Article 8 of the 1826 Charter stated that Portuguese citizenship is lost "by those who are banished by sentence". The fact that Duarte Nuno and his father had not been born in Portugal, and the fact that their family had been banished from Portugal left it unclear whether their branch's Portuguese citizenship had been preserved uninterruptedly. However, Dom Duarte's line was banished by law rather than by judicial sentence, and the 1834 constitution in force at the time of D. Miguel I's banishment did not protect the citizenship of those exiled by law. On the other hand, when the Constitutional Charter of 1826 was re-instated in 1842, it cancelled the 1834 charter's clause depriving Miguel I and his heirs of succession rights as dynasts. Their banishment had not, however, been stipulated in that charter, but in a separate law that was not repealed until 1950.

A minority of monarchists considered a candidate other than Duarte Nuno. Manuel's genealogical heir at his death in 1932 was ex-Crown Prince George of Saxony (a great-grandson of Maria II), but he was not Portuguese; he was also a Catholic priest. George's siblings have descendants living, but none is known to have had Portuguese citizenship.

The genealogical heir of Maria II's younger brother Emperor Pedro II of Brazil was his great-grandson Pedro Gastão de Orléans e Bragança; he too was not Portuguese, but the fact that he was Brazilian and therefore imbued with Portuguese culture made him a somewhat attractive candidate.

The closest heir who was undoubtedly Portuguese was Constança Berquó de Mendonça, 4th Duchess of Loulé (a great-great-granddaughter of King John VI), but her branch of the family put forth no claim at that time, nor did King Manuel II ever consider it. Many scholars claim the Loulé lost their rights to the throne since the secret marriage of the Infanta Ana de Jesus with the Marquis of Loulé had not been authorised by either the competent authority, the Cortes, nor by the Regency Committee, although it had been authorised by the Infanta-Regent. Nevertheless, the Portuguese constitution demanded more, a marriage "at King's appraisal", whereas the Infanta-Regent said expressly that she only authorised her sister's marriage "because her mother assumed all the responsibility". Moreover, 

A woman calling herself Maria Pia de Saxe-Coburgo e Bragança claimed to be the bastard daughter of King Carlos I. She also claimed to have been recognised by the King as possessing succession rights. Her supporters played upon the traditional rivalry between the Miguelist line and the Braganza-Saxe-Coburg and Gotha line to advance her cause.

Education
Duarte Nuno's first tutors were two Portuguese ladies, Maria Luisa Castelo and Maria das Dores de Sousa Prego.  Later he was taught by the Benedictine monk Frei Estevao from the monastery of Cucujães.  Duarte Nuno attended school at the Abbey of Ettal in Bavaria and the Abbey of Clairvaux in France and then completed his secondary education in Regensburg.  He received a degree in agricultural sciences from the University of Toulouse.  Although forbidden entry to Portugal by the law of exile against the descendants of Miguel I, he visited the country in secret in 1929.

Marriage

On 15 October 1942, in the cathedral of Petrópolis in Brazil, Duarte Nuno married Maria Francisca de Orléans e Bragança (8 September 1914 – 15 January 1968), daughter of Pedro de Alcântara, Prince of Grão-Pará. The marriage was particularly popular since Maria Francisca was the great-granddaughter of Pedro II of Brazil, the younger brother of Queen Maria II. The marriage thus united the two rival lines of the Portuguese royal family. Maria Francisca and her family were also viewed as representatives of a liberal monarchy as opposed to the traditional conservatism of Duarte Nuno's family.

Return to Portugal
On 27 May 1950 the National Assembly repealed the laws of exile of 19 December 1834 and 15 October 1910. Duarte Nuno, however, did not return to Portugal until 1952 on account of a car accident in Thionville in which he was seriously injured.  He was presented with a residence in Portugal by the Fundação Casa de Bragança.

Portuguese dictator António de Oliveira Salazar thought about restoring the monarchy in 1951, after the death of President Óscar Carmona, but he chose instead to hold the 1951 Portuguese presidential election and maintain the post of republican Head of State as it had appeared in the Constitution of 1933.

In 1974, Duarte Nuno handed over his residence, the Palácio de São Marcos, to the University of Coimbra.  From then until his death two years later, he lived in southern Portugal with his unmarried sister, Princess Filippa of Braganza. American author Walter J. P. Curley interviewed Duarte Nuno near the end of his life, and his book Monarchs in Waiting describes Duarte Nuno as suffering from "nervous depression" since the death of his wife in 1968.

Duarte Nuno was Grand Master of the Order of the Immaculate Conception of Vila Viçosa and Sovereign of the Order of Saint Isabel.  He was a Bailiff Grand Cross of Honour and Devotion of the Sovereign Military Order of Malta and a Knight of the (Austrian) Order of the Golden Fleece.

Duarte Nuno is buried in the Augustinian monastery in Vila Viçosa, the traditional burial place of the Dukes of Braganza.

Dynastic orders 

  Knight Grand Cross of Justice of the Calabrian Two Sicilian Order of Saint George (Royal Family of the Two Sicilies)

Genealogy

Ancestry

Issue

References

Further reading

D. Duarte Nuno de Bragança, um rei que não reinou: testemunhos sobre a vida e a obra de D. Duarte II, Chefe da Casa Real Portuguesa. Lisbon, 1992.
Cabral, Antonio. El-Rei D. Duarte II: rei morto, rei posto, a sua vida, os seus direitos, paginas de historia. Lisbon: Livraria popular de F. Franco, 1934.
Galvão, Manuel de Bettencourt e. O Duque de Bragança. Lisbon: Edições Gama, 1945.
Miranda, Jorge O Constitucionalismo luso-brasileiro. Lisboa: Comissão nacional para as comemorações dos descobrimentos Portugueses. 2001 

|-

1907 births
1976 deaths
Dukes of Braganza
Pretenders to the Portuguese throne
Knights of the Golden Fleece of Austria
Child pretenders